HTGW may stand for:
High_temperature_insulation_wool#Alkaline_Earth_Silicate_Wool_.28AES_Wool.29
ICAO airport code for Songwe Airport
Hollyford Track Guided Walk